Ádám Steinmetz (born 11 August 1980 in Budapest) is a Hungarian water polo player, Olympic champion, and politician, who played for Hungarian Championship outfit Vasas SC. He has a brother, Barnabás Steinmetz, who is also a water polo player and two-time Olympic gold medalist. Between 2018 and 2022, he was a member of the National Assembly, in the parliamentary group of Jobbik.

Honours

National
 Olympic Games:  Gold medal - 2004
 World Championships:  Silver medal - 2005
 European Championship:  Silver medal - 2006;  Bronze medal - 2003, 2012
 Universiade: (Gold medal - 2003; Bronze medal - 1999, 2001)
 Junior World Championships: (Silver medal - 1997)
 Junior European Championship: (Silver medal - 1996)
 Youth European Championship: (Silver medal - 1995)

Club
 Euroleague Winners (1): (2009 - with Primorac Kotor)
 Cup Winners' Cup Winners (2): (1998 - with FTC; 2002 - with Vasas)
 LEN Super Cup Winner (1): (2009 - with Primorac Kotor)
 Hungarian Championship (OB I): 4x (2000 - with FTC; 2007, 2008, 2012 - with Vasas)
 Hungarian Cup (Magyar Kupa): 5x (1996 - with FTC; 2001, 2002, 2004, 2005 - with Vasas)
 Montenegrin Cup (Kup Crne Gore): 1x (2010 - with Primorac Kotor)

Awards
 Masterly youth athlete: 1997, 1998
 Member of the Hungarian team of year: 2004
 Perpetual Champion of Vasas SC (2005)
 Ministerial Certificate of Merit (2012)

Orders
   Officer's Cross of the Order of Merit of the Republic of Hungary (2004)

See also
 Hungary men's Olympic water polo team records and statistics
 List of Olympic champions in men's water polo
 List of Olympic medalists in water polo (men)
 List of World Aquatics Championships medalists in water polo

References

External links
 

1980 births
Living people
Water polo players from Budapest
Hungarian male water polo players
Water polo centre forwards
Water polo players at the 2004 Summer Olympics
Water polo players at the 2012 Summer Olympics
Medalists at the 2004 Summer Olympics
Olympic gold medalists for Hungary in water polo
World Aquatics Championships medalists in water polo
Universiade medalists in water polo
Universiade gold medalists for Hungary
Universiade bronze medalists for Hungary
Members of the National Assembly of Hungary (2018–2022)
Jobbik politicians
20th-century Hungarian people
21st-century Hungarian people